Reza Karimi (born 23 August 1998) is an Iranian footballer who plays for Machine Sazi F.C. in the Azadegan League. He primarily plays as a forward.

Club career

Early years
Reza Karimi started his career with Moghavemat Tehran in 2010 as a youth player.

He moved to the Frenz United youth academy in the summer of 2014. He participated in the Frenz International Cup 2015 in which he gave an excellent performance by scoring 2 magnificent goals against Liverpool and 1 goal against Guangzhou Evergrande.

Gostaresh Foolad
Reza Karimi moved to Gostaresh Foolad in summer 2015. He made his debut on 7 February 2016 against FC Mashhad, formerly known as Siah Jamegan Khorasan F.C.

On September 10, 2015, he played 90 minutes in the Hazfi Cup match against Razakan and scored in the 41st minute. Gostaresh eventually won 2-0.

Skënderbeu Korçë 
In the summer of 2016 Karimi signed with Albanian champions Skënderbeu Korçë. Karimi had issues with his ITC and was only allowed to play in official matches in January 2017. He made his league debut on 25 February 2017 in a 1–0 victory against Vllaznia.

On 31 May 2017, Karimi came on in the 77th minute of the Albanian Cup Final against KF Tirana. Skënderbeu eventually lost 3–1 in extra time.

KF Teuta 
In September 2017, Karimi was loaned to the Teuta Durrës. He made his league debut on 4 November 2017 in a 1-1 draw against Lachi. In the next tour, he assisted on the first goal in the match against KF Luftëtari and his team won 3-2.

Esteghlal Tehran 
Karimi signed a contract with Esteghlal Tehran in December 2018. He made his league debut on 3 April 2019 in a 0–0 draw against Saipa. On May 1 of the same year, he scored his first goal in the match against Khuzestan's Esteghlal club. In an interview with the press, he commented on this match:

"I am always grateful to Mr. Farhad Majidi. I spent the best night of my life."

On 6 May 2019, Karimi came on in the 83rd minute of the AFC Champions League against Al-Duhail.

Machine Sazi 
Karimi signed a contract with Machine Sazi in August 2021. He made his league debut on 7 October 2020 in a 0–3 loss against Shahr Khodro.

International career

Youth
Karimi was selected to join Iran under-16 to take part in the 2014 AFC U-16 Championship, under manager Mostafa Ghanbarpour. He made his debut for Iran's opening match against Sri Lanka and scored two goals in Iran's 8-0 victory. He also played in matches against Pakistan and the UAE. In the final round of the tournament, he scored 1 goal in the game with his Qatari peers and was chosen as the man of the match. In the next match against Saudi Arabia, Iran celebrated a 2-1 victory thanks to Karimi's goal, and Karimi was chosen as the man of the match in this match as well. Iran lost to North Korea's 16-year-old national team in a penalty shootout in the quarterfinals. Reza Karimi left the tournament despite a clear penalty kick.

Personal life
In an interview with the press, he said that he is a fan of Cristiano Ronaldo.

Career statistics

Club

International
<

Honours

Domestic
KF Skënderbeu Korçë
Runners-up (1): Albanian Cup: 2016–17

References

Living people
1998 births
Iranian footballers
Iranian expatriate footballers
Iran international footballers
Iran under-20 international footballers
Shahrdari Ardabil players
Gostaresh Foulad F.C. players
KF Skënderbeu Korçë players
KF Teuta Durrës players
Esteghlal F.C. players
People from Ardabil
Persian Gulf Pro League players
Kategoria Superiore players
Association football forwards